In economics and finance, rational herding is a situation in which market participants react to information about the behavior of other market agents or participants rather than the behavior of the market, and the fundamental transactions. 

An account cited that rational herding is an unintended consequence of the string of Federal Reserve interventions that mandated greater transparency of others' trade activities starting in 2007. Due to crisis environment and uncertainty in the market fundamentals, investors started to use the Federal Reserve's information found in its policy pronouncements.

Rational herding in financial markets can take place because some investors believe others to be better informed than themselves, and follow them, disregarding their own information or market fundamentals. This is based on the idea that if information is costly for an uninformed actor, his ignorance is rational and that, if he cannot afford the information, there is a potential benefit of following another player who can pay for such information. 

Reliance on rational herding can be a source of instability in financial markets. There are also scholars who note that rational herding is still based on anecdotal observations and that there is lack of empirical evidence due to the way the so-called "herding literature" focuses on the price or investment patterns, information that is readily available.

References

Financial markets
Behavioral economics